Fitlads is a social networking, dating/hookup website and app for gay, bisexual and non-heterosexual men, as well as other men who have sex with men in the United Kingdom. It was launched in April 2003, and introduced video to the app in 2008.

The website is geared towards stereotypical "straight-acting" working-class "chav" or "scally"-type "lads", as well as those with a fetish for sports kits or bondage. It has a rating system for videos, which is seen by scholar David G. Kreps as communicating more "about sex ... than it is about sex itself".

Between 2014 and 2015, the website was one of those used by the serial killer Stephen Port as a means of initially contacting his victims. He also maintained accounts on Sleepyboy, Grindr, Hornet, Badoo, Gaydar, Flirt, DaddyHunt, PlanetRomeo, Manhunt, Slaveboys and CouchSurfing.

References 

LGBT social networking services
Same sex online dating
Social networking services
Online dating services
Online dating applications